Garett Grist (born April 9, 1995 in Grimsby, Ontario, Canada) is a racing driver.

Grist made his professional debut in the 2013 U.S. F2000 National Championship from Andretti Autosport. In 2014 moved up the Road to Indy ladder into the Pro Mazda Championship from Andretti Autosport. He returned to the series in 2015 from Juncos Racing. He finished third in points with three wins. He returned to the team in series in 2016 but decided to move to Indy Lights with Team Pelfrey after scoring three podium finishes in the first seven races, but a dominant season by Patricio O'Ward put the championship logically out of reach. Grist made his Indy Lights debut at Road America.

Motorsports career results

American open–wheel racing results

U.S. F2000 National Championship

Pro Mazda Championship

Indy Lights

WeatherTech SportsCar Championship

Complete 24 Hours of Le Mans results

References

External links
  
 

1995 births
Living people
Racing drivers from Ontario
People from Grimsby, Ontario
U.S. F2000 National Championship drivers
Indy Pro 2000 Championship drivers
Indy Lights drivers
24 Hours of Daytona drivers
24 Hours of Le Mans drivers
Juncos Hollinger Racing drivers
Andretti Autosport drivers
Team Pelfrey drivers
Starworks Motorsport drivers
DragonSpeed drivers
United Autosports drivers
Extreme Speed Motorsports drivers
Bryan Herta Autosport drivers
Le Mans Cup drivers
WeatherTech SportsCar Championship drivers